Canandaigua Academy is a high school (grades 9-12) in Canandaigua, New York, United States. It is part of the Canandaigua City School District. The school was named a national Blue Ribbon School of Excellence by the U.S. Department of Education in 1996. Jamie Farr is the Superintendent of Schools. Marissa Logue is the principal of Canandaigua Academy. There were 129 professional staff members and 1,105 students as of 2019.

In 2009 and 2010, Newsweek magazine named it one of the top 1,500 U.S. public high schools.

History

Canandaigua Academy was founded in 1791 as a private boys' school. In its early years it was a key point for education in the general region and the majority of its students were boarding students. 

It became a public high school in 1900, but retained "Academy" in its name.

The current Canandaigua Academy is the fourth academy since its founding in 1791. The first was located on Saltonstall Street (the site no longer exists); the second was on Main Street, now Fort Hill Apartments; the third was on Granger Street, and is now Canandaigua Middle School. The current building was built in 1991, and suits the needs of all departments.

On March 14, 2006, President George W. Bush visited Canandaigua Academy to inform the public about Medicare.

In 2007, renovations were made on the southwestern wing of the building. The building's music wing was expanded to host additional classroom space, to be used by the Hochstein School of Music. Additionally, an expansive field house was appended to the gym on the southern side of the building to meet the needs of the Physical Education department.

On May 5, 2009, a student named Tom Kane killed himself with a shotgun in a bathroom stall at Canandaigua Academy. No additional casualties were caused.

In the summer of 2015, the boys' locker room was renovated for the 2015-2016 school year. The school began construction in 2016 on a new sports complex which was completed in 2017. Among the new facilities are a new stadium-style track, additional facilities, new parking areas, and concession stand facilities on the soccer field below the track. The school also installed turf fields.

Notable alumni
Frank C. Ball, cofounder of Ball Brothers Glass Manufacturing Company
Alfred E. Bates, U.S. Army major general
John Mason Clarke, paleontologist
Stephen A. Douglas, an American politician from Illinois known for his famous political rivalry with Abraham Lincoln, attended the Canandaigua Academy during the 1820s before moving to Illinois to study law. Douglas represented Illinois in the U.S. House of Representatives and  U.S. Senate, and was an unsuccessful candidate for president in 1860.
Carol Hirschmugl, research scientist and professor of physics
Michael E. O'Hanlon, senior fellow at The Brookings Institution
Michael Park, actor
Ryan Poles, general manager of the Chicago Bears

Extracurricular activities

Athletics

The school's sports teams are known as the Braves, and wear cherry and grey team colors. The teams are in section V in the NYSPHAA.

In 2018 the Canandaigua Academy Cheerleaders won the NYSPHSAA Division 1 (Small) Championship, coached by Laura Burgess, Candace Foley, Kirstyn Morrell, and Maria Catalano.

Other state championships for the school include girls' volleyball and boys' lacrosse, both in 2009. The Canandaigua girls' swim team has won section V sectionals first place for 11 years straight. In 1999, the football team won a state championship.

In recent years, the Academy has hosted the Special Olympics, a day-long event which unites students and staff in support of disabled students and children in athletic competitions.

Music

Canandaigua Academy students are very active in the performing arts - with two concert bands (Symphonic Band and Wind Ensemble), two jazz bands, a pep band (The Sound), two orchestras (Chamber Orchestra and Symphony Orchestra), and four choirs (Mixed Chorus, Women's Choir, Jazz Choir and Madrigal Choir). The Canandaigua Academy Music Department can be found on Twitter and YouTube. The Choral Department can be found on YouTube as "CA Choirs."

The Academy Music Department is led by band director Gregory Kane, who works alongside orchestra director Haley Moore, band director Diana Chase, and choral director Sean Perry. The choral department was formerly led by nationally recognized music educator Amy Story. Retiring in 2015, Story was honored as the American Choral Directors' Association's "Helen Kemp Award" winner in 2012 for a lifetime commitment to vocal and educational excellence. She is a registered NYSSMA adjudicator, an active member of ACDA, a conductor for numerous honor choirs across New York and Pennsylvania, and continues to work with the Rochester Philharmonic Orchestra (RPO).

Since 2006, the Canandaigua Music Department has hosted a number of guest musicians and artist/educator visits including:
Eric Whitacre
Z. Randall Stroope
Ingrid Jensen
Camille Thurman

The Canandaigua Academy Players, led by Megan Davis, Sean Perry, and Jim Kelly, has also been recognized for its achievements by Channel 10 News 2017 Rochester ROCS Best Theatre Company and Rochester Broadway Theater League's "Stars of Tomorrow," having taken high honors for many of its musicals.  The Academy Players continue to produce a play in the fall and a musical in the spring.  2023's musical will be Addams Family The Musical.  

In 2017, the Finger Lakes Opera moved their performing venue from the State University of New York at Geneseo to the performance hall at the Canandaigua Academy.[5]

References

External links

 Official website
 Canandaigua Academy bans suggestive dancing
 Grinding ban spurs walkout turmoil

1791 establishments in New York (state)
Canandaigua, New York
Educational institutions established in 1791
Public high schools in New York (state)
Schools in Ontario County, New York